Anthony Frederick Harper (26 May 1925 – 28 June 1982) was an English football wing half or inside forward who made 173 appearances in the Football League for Brentford.

Club career

Headington United 
Harper began his career at Spartan League hometown club Headington United and departed the club in March 1948.

Brentford 
Harper signed for Second Division club Brentford in March 1948. He began his time with the Bees as an inside forward and made his debut in a 2–1 defeat to Leicester City at Griffin Park on 15 September 1948. Harper missed the entire 1949–50 season due to illness, but broke into the team in the 1950–51 season as a wing half and formed a celebrated half back line with Ron Greenwood and Jimmy Hill. He made a career-high 41 appearances during the 1951–52 season and held his place until Ken Coote began to establish himself in the wing half position. Harper played on until the 1954–55 season and dropped into the reserves in the latter stages of the campaign. He departed Brentford in the summer of 1955 and made 188 appearances and scored seven goals in his seven years with the club.

Return to Headington United 
Harper returned to Headington United, then members of the Southern League, during the 1955 off-season. He made over 137 further appearances before retiring in 1959.

Personal life 
After experiencing trouble commuting from his Oxford home to Brentford, Harper stayed in a club house in Hounslow with teammate Ted Gaskell and Gaskell's wife, before eventually moving into the house next door.

Career statistics

References

1925 births
Footballers from Oxford
English footballers
Association football defenders
Brentford F.C. players
English Football League players
Oxford United F.C. players
Association football wing halves
Association football inside forwards
Southern Football League players
1982 deaths